Raymond John Hamilton Wilkins (16 August 1928 – 3 March 2018) was an English footballer, who played as a forward. He made appearances in the English football league in the 1950s for Derby County and Wrexham.

Playing career
After three years of compulsory Navy service, Wilkins was spotted playing for local club Moira United by Derby County, who signed him in January 1950.

He would spend 4 years with The Rams, before signing for non-league Boston United in 1954. He would be 1 of 6 former Derby County players to play for Boston United during their 1–6 away win against Derby in the second round proper of the 1955–56 FA Cup.

In 1957 he would return to league football with Wrexham, however would only make 3 appearances for the Welsh club before leaving in 1958 because of a family illness.

He would also appear for non-league teams Oswestry Town, Macclesfield Town, Gresley Rovers, Wilmorton and Alvaston.

Managerial career
Wilkins would manage Crewton Sports from 1964 to 1966

Post-managerial career
Wilkins would become a P.E. teacher at a school in Mackworth, retiring in the 1980s.

Death
Wilkins died on 3 March 2018.

References

1928 births
2018 deaths
English Football League players
Derby County F.C. players
Boston United F.C. players
Wrexham A.F.C. players
Oswestry Town F.C. players
Macclesfield Town F.C. players
Gresley F.C. players
Association football forwards
English footballers
People from Church Gresley
Footballers from Derbyshire